Wanzai may refer to the following places:

Wanzai County, Yichun, Jiangxi
Mandarin pinyin spelling for Wan Chai, an area of Hong Kong
Mandarin pinyin spelling for Wan Tsai, a peninsula of Hong Kong
Chinese name for Lapa, an island in Zhuhai, Guangdong